Crystal Cave is a marble karst cave within Sequoia National Park, in the western Sierra Nevada of California. It is one of at least 240 known caves in Sequoia National Park. Crystal Cave is in the Giant Forest area, between the Ash Mountain entrance of the park and the Giant Forest museum.

The cave is a constant . It is accessible by Park Service guided tours only. Tickets are not sold on-site, but must be bought at the Foothills or Lodgepole Visitor Center.

References

External links
Caves and Karst Management, Sequoia and Kings Canyon National Park
Caves Biology, Sequoia and Kings Canyon National Park

Caves of California
Sequoia National Park
Limestone caves
Landforms of the Sierra Nevada (United States)
Landforms of Tulare County, California
Show caves in the United States